Billy Mitchell Airport  is a public use airport located four nautical miles (5 mi, 7 km) east of the central business district of Hatteras, in Dare County, North Carolina, United States. The airport is located in the Cape Hatteras National Seashore and is owned by the National Park Service. It is named after United States Army Air Service General Billy Mitchell, and is included in the National Plan of Integrated Airport Systems for 2017–2021, which categorized it as a general aviation facility.

Although most U.S. airports use the same three-letter location identifier for the FAA and IATA, Billy Mitchell Airport is assigned HSE by the FAA and HNC by the IATA. The airport's ICAO identifier is KHSE.

Facilities and aircraft 
Billy Mitchell Airport covers an area of 100 acres (40 ha) at an elevation of 17 feet (5 m) above mean sea level. It has one runway designated 7/25 with an asphalt surface measuring 3,002 by 75 feet (915 x 23 m).

For the 12-month period ending March 18, 2016, the airport had 9,200 aircraft operations, an average of 25 per day: 98% general aviation, 1% air taxi and 1% military.

References

External links 
 Billy Mitchell Airport
  at North Carolina DOT airport guide
 Aerial image as of March 1993 from USGS The National Map
 

Airports in North Carolina
Buildings and structures in Dare County, North Carolina
Transportation in Dare County, North Carolina
Hatteras Island
National Park Service